Tomáš Fabián (born 10 September 1989) is a Czech football player who plays as a midfielder for Austrian club USV Oed/Zeillern.

Fabián played for Czech youth national teams and took part in the 2009 FIFA U-20 World Cup.

Career
In February 2019, Fabián left Mladá Boleslav and later joined SK Zápy. In the summer 2019, he moved to Austrian club USV Oed/Zeillern.

References

External links
 
 
 

Czech footballers
Czech Republic youth international footballers
Czech Republic under-21 international footballers
Czech First League players
Czech National Football League players
FK Mladá Boleslav players
FK Varnsdorf players
1989 births
Living people
Sportspeople from Mladá Boleslav
Association football midfielders
Czech expatriate sportspeople in Austria
Expatriate footballers in Austria